The 2002 Four Continents Figure Skating Championships was an international figure skating competition in the 2001–02 season. It was held at the Hwasan Indoor Ice Rink in Jeonju, South Korea on January 21–27. Medals were awarded in the disciplines of men's singles, ladies' singles, pair skating, and ice dancing. The first compulsory dance was the Ravensburger Waltz and the second was the Blues.

Medals table

Results

Men

Ladies

Pairs

Ice dancing

External links
 2002 Four Continents Figure Skating Championships
 http://www.cbc.ca/sports/story/2002/01/26/buttle020126.html
 https://web.archive.org/web/20120302154723/http://ww2.isu.org/news/4cont1.html
 https://web.archive.org/web/20120324011734/http://ww2.isu.org/news/4cont2.html
 https://web.archive.org/web/20120324011752/http://ww2.isu.org/news/4cont3.html
 https://web.archive.org/web/20120324011757/http://ww2.isu.org/news/4cont4.html

Four Continents Figure Skating Championships, 2002
F
Four Continents Figure Skating Championships
Four Continents
Sports competitions in Jeonju
International figure skating competitions hosted by South Korea